Zabolotiv (Zablotov) is an urban-type settlement in Kolomyia Raion of Ivano-Frankivsk Oblast in Western Ukraine. It hosts the administration of Zabolotiv urban hromada, one of the hromadas of Ukraine. Population: . In 2001, the population was 4,129.

History 
Starting from 1790, a growing Jewish community became an important part of local life. At the beginning of the 20th century, antisemitic unrest culminated in the first pogrom in Zabolotiv in 1903. Later, German Nazis exterminated one part of the Jewish population while others managed to flee to the United States and Israel.

Until 18 July 2020, Zabolotiv belonged to Sniatyn Raion. The raion was abolished in July 2020 as part of the administrative reform of Ukraine, which reduced the number of raions of Ivano-Frankivsk Oblast to six. The area of Sniatyn Raion was merged into Kolomyia Raion.

Notable people 
 Otto M. Nikodym (1887–1974) (Otton Martin Nikodým), Polish mathematician
 Manes Sperber (1905–1984), Austrian-French novelist, essayist and psychologist, who wrote under the pseudonyms Jan Heger and N.A. Menlos
 Svitlana Onyshchuk (born 1984), Ukrainian government official

References

External links

 A City and the Dead; Zablotow Alive and Destroyed Memorial Book of Zabolotov (Zablotow) (Ukraine)

Urban-type settlements in Kolomyia Raion
Shtetls
Holocaust locations in Ukraine
Populated places on the Prut